The 103rd Street–Corona Plaza station is a local station on the IRT Flushing Line of the New York City Subway, located at the intersection of 103rd Street and Roosevelt Avenue. It is served by the 7 train at all times.

History

Early history 
The 1913 Dual Contracts called for the Interborough Rapid Transit Company (IRT) and Brooklyn Rapid Transit Company (BRT; later Brooklyn–Manhattan Transit Corporation, or BMT) to build new lines in Brooklyn, Queens, and the Bronx. Queens did not receive many new IRT and BRT lines compared to Brooklyn and the Bronx, since the city's Public Service Commission (PSC) wanted to alleviate subway crowding in the other two boroughs first before building in Queens, which was relatively undeveloped. The IRT Flushing Line was to be one of two Dual Contracts lines in the borough, along with the Astoria Line; it would connect Flushing and Long Island City, two of Queens' oldest settlements, to Manhattan via the Steinway Tunnel. When the majority of the line was built in the early 1910s, most of the route went through undeveloped land, and Roosevelt Avenue had not been constructed. Community leaders advocated for more Dual Contracts lines to be built in Queens to allow development there. 

This station opened on April 21, 1917, as Alburtis Avenue, as the easternmost station of an extension of the Flushing line past Queensboro Plaza. It was later renamed 104th Street, giving the possibility of a sealed exit at the north end, before taking its current name of 103rd Street–Corona Plaza. This station still contains signs showing Alburtis Avenue, but which now have been covered up. This station was the eastern terminal for the joint BMT and IRT services on the line until the extension to 111th Street opened on October 13, 1925.

Later years 
The city government took over the IRT's operations on June 12, 1940. The IRT routes were given numbered designations in 1948 with the introduction of "R-type" rolling stock, which contained rollsigns with numbered designations for each service. The route from Times Square to Flushing became known as the 7. On October 17, 1949, the joint BMT/IRT operation of the Flushing Line ended, and the line became the responsibility of the IRT. After the end of BMT/IRT dual service, the New York City Board of Transportation announced that the Flushing Line platforms would be lengthened to 11 IRT car lengths; the platforms were only able to fit nine 51-foot-long IRT cars beforehand. The platforms at the station were extended in 1955–1956 to accommodate 11-car trains. However, nine-car trains continued to run on the 7 route until 1962, when they were extended to ten cars. With the opening of the 1964 New York World's Fair, trains were lengthened to eleven cars. 

As part of the 2015–2019 Capital Program, the Metropolitan Transportation Authority would renovate the 52nd, 61st, 69th, 82nd, 103rd and 111th Streets stations, a project that has been delayed for several years but is slated to begin in mid-2020. Conditions at these stations were among the worst of all stations in the subway system.

Station layout

This elevated station has three tracks and two side platforms. The center track is used by the rush hour peak direction <7> express service. Both platforms have beige windscreens and brown canopies supported by green frames and support columns in the center and green waist-high steel fences at both ends. The station names are in the standard black plates with white lettering, though some lampposts at both ends have their original white signs in black lettering.

Exits
This station's only entrance/exit is an elevated station house beneath the tracks. A pair of staircases from either side of Roosevelt Avenue between 103rd and 104th Streets go up to the station house, where there is a token booth in the center and a turnstile bank on either side. Both turnstile banks lead to a wooden waiting area/crossunder and have a single staircase going up to either platform.

References

External links 

 
 The Subway Nut — 103rd Street–Corona Plaza Pictures 
 103rd Street entrance from Google Maps Street View
 Platforms from Google Maps Street View

IRT Flushing Line stations
New York City Subway stations in Queens, New York
Railway stations in the United States opened in 1917
1917 establishments in New York City
Corona, Queens